Boissy is the name or part of the name of 18 communes of France:
Boissy-aux-Cailles
Boissy-en-Drouais
Boissy-Fresnoy
Boissy-l'Aillerie
Boissy-la-Rivière
Boissy-Lamberville
Boissy-le-Bois
Boissy-le-Châtel
Boissy-le-Cutté
Boissy-le-Repos
Boissy-le-Sec
Boissy-lès-Perche
Boissy-Maugis
Boissy-Mauvoisin
Boissy-Saint-Léger
Boissy-sans-Avoir in the Yvelines département
Boissy-sous-Saint-Yon
Roy-Boissy

Surname 
 Louis de Boissy (1694–1758), French poet and playwright
 Louis Michel de Boissy (1725–1793), son of the former, French historian